Sărățica Nouă is a commune in Leova District, Moldova. It is composed of two villages, Cîmpul Drept and Sărățica Nouă.

References

Communes of Leova District